Bat-Sheva Ofra Haza (19 November 1957 – 23 February 2000) was an Israeli singer, songwriter, actress, and Grammy Award-nominated recording artist commonly known in the Western world as "the Madonna of the East", or "the Israeli Madonna". Her voice has been described as a "tender" mezzo-soprano.

Of Mizrahi Jewish (Yemenite-Jewish) descent, Haza's music is known as a mixture of traditional Middle Eastern and commercial singing styles, fusing elements of Eastern and Western instrumentation, orchestration and dance-beat, as well as lyrics from Mizrahi and Jewish folk tales and poetry. By the late 1980s, Haza was an internationally successful artist, achieving large success in Europe and the Americas and appearing regularly on MTV. During her singing career, she earned many platinum and gold discs and her music proved highly popular in the club scene. By the 1990s, at the peak of her career, she regularly featured in movie soundtracks, such as that of Dick Tracy (1990) and famously in the Prince of Egypt (1998), plus her vocals were popularly sampled in hip hop. Her death in 2000 from an AIDS-related illness shocked the Israeli public and was the subject of much controversy in Israel.

In Israel, Haza was a highly influential cultural figure, referred to as one of the country's biggest cultural icons, who helped to popularize Mizrahi culture.

Early life
Bat-Sheva Ofra Haza was born in Tel Aviv, Israel, to Mizrahi Jewish parents from Yemen who had immigrated to Israel in 1949 with eight children. She was the youngest of nine children (six sisters and two brothers) to Yefet and Shoshana Haza. They were raised in a Masorti household in the Hatikva Quarter, then an impoverished, working-class neighborhood of Tel Aviv. Although named Bat-Sheva by her parents, her sisters disliked the name, and preferred to call her by her middle name, Ofra, instead.

Haza's earliest musical influences included her learning traditional Yemenite songs from her parents; Haza's mother in particular, Shoshana, proved a major influence on her musical direction. Shoshana had been a professional singer in Yemen and often performed at family celebrations, with Haza also recalling her mother singing to her children from an early age. Additionally early influences in her music came from Israeli folk songs, the Beatles, and Elvis Presley.

Haza herself began to exhibit a similar musical inclination to that of her mother, and began singing at an early age, including at local weddings and as a soloist in her school choir. At the age of 12, Haza joined a local protest theater troupe, named “Hatikva” (The Hope) which had been recently founded by a neighbor of hers, Bezalel Azoni.  Haza soon emerged as one of the most gifted performers in the troupe, and manager Bezalel Aloni soon noticed her singing talent. He spotlighted her in many of his productions, and later became her manager and mentor. At 19, she was Israel's foremost pop star, and news articles have retrospectively described her as "the Madonna of the East".

Haza served two years in the Israel Defense Forces.

International artist

She represented Israel in the Eurovision Song Contest 1983, with the song "Hi", finishing second with 136 points. Her major international breakthrough came in the wake of the album Shirei Teiman ("Yemenite songs"), which she recorded in 1984. The album consisted of songs that Haza had heard in childhood, using arrangements that combined authentic Middle Eastern percussion with classical instruments. Further recognition came with the single "Im Nin'alu", taken from the album Shaday (1988), which won the New Music Award for Best International Album of the Year. The song topped the Eurochart for two weeks in June that year and was on heavy rotation on MTV channels across the continent. In the annals of classical hip-hop this song would be extensively re-released, re-mixed and sampled, for example on Coldcut's remix of Eric B. & Rakim's "Paid in Full". The single made only a brief appearance in the UK top 40 singles chart, but became a dance floor favorite across Europe and the US, topping the German charts for nine weeks. Subsequent singles were also given the dance-beat / MTV-style video treatment, most notably, Galbi, Daw Da Hiya and Mata Hari, but none quite matched the runaway success of her first hit. Im Nin'alu would go on to be featured on an in-game radio playlist of the video game Grand Theft Auto: Liberty City Stories, released in 2005 and featured on Panjabi MC's album "Indian Timing" in 2009.

Haza also received critical acclaim for the albums Fifty Gates of Wisdom (1984), Desert Wind (1989), Kirya (1992) and Ofra Haza (1997).

In 1992, Kirya (co-produced by Don Was) received a Grammy nomination.

In 1994, Haza released her first Hebrew album in seven years, Kol Haneshama ("The Whole Soul"). Though not an initial chart success, the album produced one of her biggest hits to date, Le'orech Hayam ("Along The Sea"), written by Ayala Asherov. The song did not have any substantial chart success upon its release to radio but became an anthem after Haza performed it on the assembly in memorial to deceased Prime Minister Yitzhak Rabin, a week after he was assassinated. Radio stations around the country began to play it. Its lyrics became even more symbolic following Haza's own death in 2000.

Collaborations and performances

Her collaborative work with internationally established acts included the single "Temple of Love (Touched by the Hand of Ofra Haza)", recorded with The Sisters of Mercy in 1992. Thomas Dolby co-produced Yemenite Songs and Desert Wind, on which he was also a guest musician. Haza guested on Dolby's album Astronauts And Heretics (1992), singing on the track "That's Why People Fall in Love". She recorded "My Love Is for Real" with Paula Abdul in 1995 and on Sarah Brightman's album Harem, Haza's vocals were included on "Mysterious Days", thanks to an idea by Brightman's partner Frank Peterson (ex-Enigma), who produced both Harem (2003) and the album Ofra Haza (1997). Haza also sang backing vocals on the song "Friend of Stars" by the German electro-pop band And One, from the Spot (1993) album.

For the Kirya album, Iggy Pop, a friend of Don Was, performed the narration on "Daw Da Hiya" and Haza joined him and a host of other stars for the video and single release "Give Peace A Chance" in 1991. She also sang on the soundtracks of Colors (1988), Dick Tracy (1990), Wild Orchid (1990), Queen Margot (1994) and The Prince of Egypt (1998).

In The Prince of Egypt, she provided her voice for the role Yocheved, singing "Deliver Us". When Hans Zimmer, who was working with Haza on the music for The Prince of Egypt, introduced her to the artists, they thought that she was so beautiful that they drew Yocheved to look like the singer. For the film's soundtrack, Haza sang the song "Deliver Us" in 19 languages, about half of which were sung phonetically, including:
 Czech — "Tak vyveď nás"
 Dutch — "Verlos ons, Heer"
 English — "Deliver Us"
 Finnish — "Johdata"
 French — "Délivre nous"
 German — "Erlöse uns"
 Greek — "Eleftheri"
 Hebrew — "Hoshia Na"
 Hungarian — "Szabadíts"
 Italian — "Ascoltaci"
 Norwegian — "Befri Oss"
 Polish — "Uwolnij nas"
 Portuguese (Brazilian and European) — "Liberte-nos"
 Romanian - "Izbăvește-ne"
 Slovak - ???
 Spanish (Latin and Castilian) — "Libéranos"
 Swedish — "Befria Oss"

On the soundtrack of The Governess (1998), Haza is the featured singer on seven of the twelve tracks and worked closely with film music composer Edward Shearmur. In 1999, she performed (together with late Pakistani artist Nusrat Fateh Ali Khan) the track "Forgiveness", on the contemporary symphony album The Prayer Cycle by Jonathan Elias. As a featured background vocalist, Haza's voice has been recorded, re-mixed or sampled for Black Dog's "Babylon" single, Eric B and Rakim's "Paid in Full (Coldcut Remix)", "Temple of Love (1992)" by The Sisters of Mercy, and for the M/A/R/R/S hit "Pump Up The Volume". The single "Love Song" has been re-mixed by DJs many times, its powerful vocal performance and comparatively sparse musical arrangement making it the perfect vehicle for a dance-rhythm accompaniment.

Covers of songs by other artists included the Carole King/James Taylor song "You've Got a Friend", Madonna's "Open Your Heart", Gary Moore's "Separate Ways", and Led Zeppelin's "Kashmir".

There were many live performances and Haza spoke with fond memories of her visits to Japan and Turkey. She performed at the 1994 Nobel Peace Prize ceremony in Oslo, where she appeared alongside Irish singer Sinéad O'Connor. "Paint Box" was written specially for the event. Her 1990 live recording, Ofra Haza at Montreux Jazz Festival was released in 1998.

Haza shared duets and concert performances with Glykeria, Yehudit Ravitz, Paul Anka, Paula Abdul, Michael Jackson, Iggy Pop, Hoite, Buddha Bar, Ishtar, Gidi Gov, Whitney Houston, Tzvika Pick, Khaled, Prachim Yerushalaim, The Sisters of Mercy, Thomas Dolby, Stefan Waggershausen, Eric B and Rakim, Gila Miniha, Hans Zimmer, Hagashash Hachiver, Yaffa Yarkoni, Dana International, Shoshana Damari and posthumously with Sarah Brightman.

In late 1999, Haza recorded new material for a new album that she worked on with Ron Aviv, a music producer from Petah Tikva. At the time, she also worked with the Finnish violinist Linda Brava, who released a previously unreleased track called Tarab on her MySpace page on 14 May 2010. On the track, Haza sings in English, Arabic and Hebrew, while Brava plays the electric violin. The track is possibly Haza's last recording.

In the summer of 2021, the British-Belgian EDM band Gravity Noir created a completely new music arrangement for Im Nin'alu. Ofra Haza's original vocals were retained for this, and Ofra Haza also features in their Music video as a special tribute. Gravity Noir featuring Ofra Haza - Im Nin Alu 2021, was officially released on July 14, 2021. The feature film ANKH was subsequently released in 2022, in which Ofra Haza can be seen and heard several times in archive footage.

Marriage
On 15 July 1997, Haza married businessman Doron Ashkenazi. The couple had no children, but Ashkenazi had an adopted son, Shai, and a biological daughter from his first marriage.

Death

Ofra Haza died on 23 February 2000, at the age of 42, of AIDS. While the fact that she was HIV-positive is now generally known, the decision by the Israeli newspaper Haaretz to report it shortly after her death was controversial in Israel.

After Haza's death was announced, Israeli radio stations played non-stop retrospectives of her music. Then-Prime Minister Ehud Barak praised her work as a cultural emissary, commenting that she also represented the Israeli success story — "Ofra emerged from the Hatikvah slums to reach the peak of Israeli culture. She has left a mark on us all."

Haza's death from an AIDS-related illness added another layer to the public mourning. The revelation of Haza's illness caused much surprise among fans, along with debate about whether the media invaded her privacy by reporting it. There was also speculation about how she had acquired the virus. Immediately after her death, the media placed blame on her husband, Tel Aviv businessman Doron Ashkenazi, for infecting her with the disease. Haza's manager Bezalel Aloni supported this belief, writing in his book that Haza acquired AIDS through sex with her husband. Later, it was revealed that her husband believed Haza became infected because of a blood transfusion she received in a hospital following a miscarriage. Ashkenazi himself died of a drug overdose roughly one year later on 7 April 2001, leaving a daughter from a prior marriage and a 14-year-old adopted son, Shai Ashkenazi.

Haza is buried in the Artists section of Yarkon Cemetery in Petah Tikva near Tel Aviv.

Legacy
Bezalel Aloni, Haza's manager and producer of 28 years, published a book Michtavim L'Ofra (Letters to Ofra) in 2007. The book is partly Aloni's autobiography and partly a biography of Haza, and includes letters written by Aloni.

On 22 March 2007, on the seventh anniversary of her death, the Tel Aviv-Yafo Municipality and the Tel Aviv Development Fund renamed part of the public park in the Hatikva Quarter Gan Ofra (Ofra's Park) in her honor. The park is placed at the end of Bo'az street, in which Haza's childhood home stood. The park features a children's playground, symbolizing her love for children and the old quarter she grew up in and always came back to.

On 19 November 2014, Google celebrated her 57th birthday with a Google Doodle. Pakistani blogger Sarmad Iqbal who is known for his pro-peace stance, praised Ofra Haza enthusiastically in his blog post titled A Pakistani's love letter to Israeli pop music and cinema for The Times of Israel in 2017. Sarmad wrote "She was more than just a cultural icon of Israel as she also tried to bridge the wide gap between Israel and her Arab neighbors as her songs spread to a wider Middle-Eastern audience defying all the barriers to peace and friendship between Arabs and Israel."

In the video game Grand Theft Auto: Liberty City Stories, her track "Im Nin'Alu" is featured in a fictional radio station which plays Middle Eastern and Indian Music.

In 2023, Rolling Stone ranked Haza at number 186 on its list of the 200 Greatest Singers of All Time.

Tributes
 Touched By the Hand of Ofra Haza Fanzine (2008–09) was a tribute fanzine.
 Sharim Ofra (Singing Ofra) 2002 – A tribute concert to commemorate the life of Ofra Haza where Israeli singers sang Haza's songs.
 Fulfilled Wish is a digital EP by Russian ambient- and downtempo duo Koan, released in 2007.

Documentaries
 Life & Death of Ofra Haza 2002 – Aired on the Israeli channel 2, 29 January 2002. This documentary in Hebrew focuses on Haza's entire life and career until her death.
 Sodot (Secrets) 2005 – Aired on Israeli channel YES, this documentary in Hebrew and partly English is about Haza's life and attempts to answer questions surrounding her death.
 Dokoceleb Ofra Haza 2007 – Aired on the Israeli entertainment station HOT, 22 February 2007. This documentary in Hebrew focuses on Haza's career, achievements and marriage.
 Lost Treasure of Ofra Haza 2010 – Aired on the Israeli channel 10, 22 February 2010. This documentary in Hebrew and partly English focuses on Haza's legacy.

Discography

Albums
 Studio albums

 1974: Ahava Rishona • First Love (with Shechunat Hatikvah Workshop Theatre)
 1976: Vehutz Mizeh Hakol Beseder • Apart from that All Is OK (with Shechunat Hatikvah Workshop Theatre)
 1977: Atik Noshan • Ancient Old (with Shechunat Hatikvah Workshop Theatre)
 1977: Shir HaShirim Besha'ashu'im • The Song of Songs (with Fun)
 1980: Al Ahavot Shelanu • About Our Loves
 1981: Bo Nedaber • Let's Talk
 1982: Pituyim • Temptations
 1982: Li-yeladim • Songs for Children (children's album)
 1983: Hai • Alive
 1983: Shirey Moledet  • Homeland Songs
 1984: Bayt Ham • A Place for Me
 1984: Yemenite Songs • Shiri Teyman (aka Fifty Gates of Wisdom)
 1985: Adamah • Earth
 1985: Shirey Moledet 2 • Homeland Songs 2
 1986: Yamim Nishbarim • Broken Days
 1987: Shirey Moledet 3 • Homeland Songs 3
 1988: Shaday
 1989: Desert Wind
 1992: Kirya
 1994: Kol Haneshama • My Soul
 1995: Queen in Exile
 1997: Ofra Haza

 Live albums
 1998: Ofra Haza at Montreux Jazz Festival

 Compilations
 1983: Selected Hits (with Shechunat Hatikvah Workshop Theatre)
 1986: Album HaZahav • Golden Album
 2000: Manginat Halev Vol. 1 • Melody of the Heart Vol. 1
 2004: Manginat Halev Vol. 2 • Melody of the Heart Vol. 2
 2008: Forever Ofra Haza (remix album)

Singles

Soundtracks

 1988: Colors
 1990: Dick Tracy
 1990: Wild Orchid
 1994: La Reine Margot (Queen Margot)
 1998: The Prince of Egypt
 1998: The Governess
 1999: The King And I (Hebrew version)
 2000: American Psycho: Music from the Controversial Motion Picture
 2022: ANKH, O.S.T. by Gravity Noir featuring Ofra Haza

See also

 List of Israeli musical artists
 List of mezzo-sopranos in non-classical music
 Honorific nicknames in popular music

References

External links

 
 

1957 births
2000 deaths
Israeli women singer-songwriters
Israeli film actresses
Israeli pop singers
Israeli women pianists
Synth-pop singers
Israeli mezzo-sopranos
20th-century Israeli Jews
Jewish Israeli musicians
Jewish Israeli actresses
Jewish Israeli writers
Jewish women singers
Jewish women writers
Israeli women columnists
Israeli columnists
Israeli dance musicians
Eurovision Song Contest entrants for Israel
Eurovision Song Contest entrants of 1983
Israeli voice actresses
Israeli people of Yemeni-Jewish descent
20th-century Mizrahi Jews
20th-century Israeli actresses
20th-century Israeli women singers
20th-century Israeli pianists
Folk-pop singers
Musicians from Tel Aviv
Sire Records artists
AIDS-related deaths in Israel
Burials at Yarkon Cemetery
20th-century Yemeni women singers
20th-century women pianists
Jewish singers